Melhus is a municipality in Trøndelag county, Norway. It is part of the Gauldalen region. The administrative centre of the municipality is the village of Melhus. Other villages include Gåsbakken, Hovin, Korsvegen, Kvål, Ler, Lundamo, Storsand, and Øysand.

Agriculture is important in Melhus, and the extensive lowland areas in the almost flat valley surrounding the Gaula River are dominated by grain fields. Many inhabitants work in the city of Trondheim, a 20-minute drive north from Melhus.

The  municipality is the 166th largest by area out of the 356 municipalities in Norway. Melhus is the 75th most populous municipality in Norway with a population of 16,123.

General information
Melhus was established as a municipality on 1 January 1838 (see formannskapsdistrikt law). In 1865, the western district of Høilandet (population: 1,818) was separated from Melhus to form a separate municipality. Then on 1880, the eastern district of Flaa (population: 614) was separated to form its own municipality. During the 1960s, there were many municipal mergers across Norway due to the work of the Schei Committee. On 1 January 1964, Melhus (population: 3,978) was merged with the neighboring municipalities of Hølonda (population: 1,428), Flå (population: 843), Horg (population: 2,560), and the small Langørgen farm area in the neighboring municipality of Buvik (population: 11) to form a new, larger municipality of Melhus.  On 1 January 2018, the municipality switched from the old Sør-Trøndelag county to the new Trøndelag county.

Name
The municipality (originally the parish) is named after the old Melhus farm since the first Melhus Church was built there.

Coat of arms
The coat of arms was granted on 8 November 1979. The official blazon is "Gules, a bowman genuant Or". This means the arms have a red field (background) and the charge is a kneeling archer. The archer has a tincture of Or which means it is commonly colored yellow, but if it is made out of metal, then gold is used. The arms were chosen to symbolize a local hero, Einar Tambarskjelve, who was a famous chief and archer from Melhus in the 11th century. He is mentioned as an archer for King Olav Tryggvason in the Battle of Svolder. The arms were designed by Hallvard Trætteberg. The municipal flag has the same design as the coat of arms.

Churches
The Church of Norway has four parishes within the municipality of Melhus. It is part of the Gauldal prosti (deanery) in the Diocese of Nidaros.

History
Melhus was the site of many important events during the Viking Era. It was the site of the farm Rimul in Melhus at which Jarl Haakon was killed by his slave, Tormod Kark. Jarlshola is the location in Melhus thought to have been the hiding place of Jarl Haakon and Tormod Kark on their last night before the infamous murder at Rimul.

Geography

The  municipality of Melhus includes the valley of the river Gaula as it flows northwards towards its mouth at the Gaulosen, an arm of the Trondheimsfjord. The lake Svorksjøen lies on the western border with Orkdal and Meldal. The lakes Benna and Ånøya lie in the central part of the municipality, and the lake Samsjøen lies on the southeastern border with Midtre Gauldal municipality. The mountains of Rensfjellet and Vassfjellet lie on the eastern border with Selbu and Klæbu municipalities, respectively.

Government
All municipalities in Norway, including Melhus, are responsible for primary education (through 10th grade), outpatient health services, senior citizen services, unemployment and other social services, zoning, economic development, and municipal roads. The municipality is governed by a municipal council of elected representatives, which in turn elect a mayor. The municipality falls under the Trøndelag District Court and the Frostating Court of Appeal.

Municipal council
The municipal council of Melhus is made up of 37 representatives that are elected to four year terms. The party breakdown of the council is as follows:

Mayors
The mayors of Melhus:

1838–1839: John Jensen Gravråk 
1840–1847: Nils Nilssøn Dahl 
1848–1851: Israel Melhus 
1852–1856: Rasmus Jagtøien 
1856–1859: Israel Melhus 
1860–1865: Lars Qvam
1866–1871: Hans Jensen Blom
1872–1875: John Skjerdingstad
1876–1881: Anders P. Skjerdingstad (H)
1882–1891: Nils Jensen Melhus (V/MV)
1892–1904: Klaus J. Søberg (V)
1905–1907: Nils Jensen Melhus (V)
1908–1913: Eystein Kvam (V)
1914–1919: Elias Gafseth (V)
1920–1922: Ole T. Hollum (H)
1923–1925: Ole T. Øyaas (V)
1926–1937: Even P. Borten (Bp)
1938–1940: Nicolay J. Eggen (Ap)
1941–1945: Hans Bollingmo (NS)
1946–1947: Anders Eggen (Bp)
1948–1955: Martin Borten (Bp)
1956–1971: Gustav Berg (Sp)
1972–1973: Johan Hogstad (Sp)
1974–1975: Bjørn Havdal (Ap)
1975–1987: Johan Hogstad (Sp)
1988–1989: Per O. Rimolsrønning (H)
1989–1995: Sigurd Busklein (Sp)
1995-2001: Anders Estenstad (Ap)
2001-2003: Solfrid Løvseth (Ap)
2003-2011: Erling Bøhle (Ap)
2011-2015: Jorid Jagtøyen (Sp)
2015-2019: Gunnar Krogstad (Ap)
2019–present: Jorid Jagtøyen (Sp)

Transportation
European route E6 runs north and south through the municipality, following the Gaula River.

The Dovre Line also follows the river through Melhus. The following stations are located along the railway line in Melhus: Melhus Station, Kvål Station, Ler Station, Lundamo Station, and Hovin Station. The railroad goes through the Gulfoss Tunnel at Hovin.

Media gallery

Newspapers
 Trønderbladet: Largest newspaper in Melhus.
 Gaula: Newspaper  published in Melhus which also covers the Midtre Gauldal and Byneset

Notable people

 Einar Thambarskelfir (ca.980 – ca.1050) influential nobleman, de facto ruler of Norway
 Johannes Klingenberg Sejersted (1761 in Flå – 1823) a Norwegian senior military officer
 Hartvig Nissen (1815 in Melhus – 1874) a Norwegian philologist and educator
 Walter Scott Dahl (1839 in Melhus – 1906) politician and Government minister
 Sophus Dahl (1877 in Horg– 1952) a Norwegian theater and film actor 
 Martin Tranmæl (1879 in Melhus – 1967) Party Secretary and MP for the Norwegian Labour Party, editor of Arbeiderbladet
 Per Borten (1913 in Flå – 2005) Prime Minister of Norway 1965 to 1971
 Odd Bye (1916 in Horg – 2010) journalist and politician
 Hans Flock (born 1940 in Melhus) Supreme Court Justice, 1996 to 2010. 
 Tor Singsaas (born 1948) Bishop of Nidaros, grew up in Melhus
 Jorun Thørring (born 1955) a Norwegian crime writer and gynaecologist, lives in Melhus
 Torstein Flakne (born 1960) rock musician, member of The Kids and founder of Stage Dolls
 Hans Bollandsås (born 1980 in Melhus) a blues musician, won the Norwegian X Factor in 2010.

Sport 
 Magnar Estenstad (1924 in Hølonda – 2004) cross-country skier, bronze and team silver medallist at the 1952 Winter Olympics
 Toralf Engan (born 1939) ski jumper, gold and silver medallist at the 1964 Winter Olympics
 Magne Thomassen (born 1941 in Melhus) speed skater silver medallist at the 1968 Winter Olympics
 Oddvar Brå (born 1951 in Hølonda) cross-country skier, team silver medallist at the 1972 & 1980 Winter Olympics
 Unni Lehn (born 1977 in Melhus) footballer, team gold medallist at the 2000 Summer Olympics
 Ingrid Syrstad Engen (born 1998 in Melhus) footballer, midfielder for FC Barcelona Femení and Norway women's national football team

References

External links

Municipal fact sheet from Statistics Norway 
Municipal website 
Melhus Prestegårdslåna 
Local history of Melhus 

 
Municipalities of Trøndelag
1838 establishments in Norway